Philip Abbott (March 20, 1924 – February 23, 1998) was an American character actor. He appeared in several films and numerous television series, including a lead role as Arthur Ward in the crime series The F.B.I. Abbott was also the founder of Theatre West in Los Angeles.

Early life
A native of Lincoln, Nebraska, Abbott attended Fordham University in New York City, and later studied acting at the Pasadena Playhouse. He served in the United States Army during World War II.

Career
Abbott was a secondary lead in several films of the 1950s and 1960s, including Miracle of the White Stallions (1963).

He made more than one hundred guest appearances on various television series from 1952 to 1995, including NBC's Justice about the Legal Aid Society of New York and The Eleventh Hour, a medical drama about psychiatry. He appeared on the CBS anthology series Appointment with Adventure and The Lloyd Bridges Show. He made two guest appearances on Perry Mason: in 1961 he played journalist Edmond Aitken in "The Case of the Envious Editor," and in 1965 he played Harry Grant in "The Case of the Wrongful Writ." He guest starred on Jack Lord's ABC series, Stoney Burke, and in Dennis Weaver's NBC sitcom, Kentucky Jones, in the episode "The Music Kids Make". In 1986 he portrayed Grant Stevens in the daytime soap The Young And Restless.

Abbott is best remembered as Assistant Director Arthur Ward on the ABC series, The F.B.I., with Efrem Zimbalist, Jr., in the starring role as Inspector Lewis Erskine.

Death
Abbott died in 1998 of cancer in  Tarzana, California. He is interred at the Roman Catholic San Fernando Mission Cemetery in Los Angeles.

Filmography

Film
 The Bachelor Party (1957) as Arnold Craig (film debut)
 The Invisible Boy (1957) as Dr. Tom Merrinoe, head of Stoneman Institute of Mathematics.
 Sweet Bird of Youth (1962) as Dr. George Scudder
 The Spiral Road (1962) as Frolick
 Miracle of the White Stallions (1963) as Col. Reed
 Those Calloways (1965) as Dell Fraser
 Hangar 18 (1980) as Frank Morrison
 Savannah Smiles (1982) as Chief Pruitt
 The First Power (1990) as Cardinal
 Pumpkin Man (1998, TV Short) as Grandpa
 Starry Night (1999) as Dr. Ruby (final film role)

Television

 Schlitz Playhouse of Stars, episode Make Way for Teddy (1952)
 You Are There, episode The Signing of the Declaration of Independence (July 4, 1776) (1953)
 The Man Behind the Badge, episode The Case of the Strategic Air Command (1954)
 Producers' Showcase, 2 episodes Dateline (1954) & Yellow Jack (1955)
 One Step Beyond, as Paul Burton in episode The Dead Part of the House (1959)
 Diagnosis: Unknown as Peter Loper in Final Performance (1960)
 Hotel de Paree, as Gilmer in episode Sundance and the Man in the Shadows (1960) 
 The Twilight Zone, episodes Long Distance Call (1961) and The Parallel (1963)
 Bus Stop, as Oliver West in episode A Lion Walks Among Us (1961)
 The Detectives Starring Robert Taylor, as Phil Norden in episode The Airtight Case (1961) 
 The Defenders, as Dr. Bill Conrad in Quality of Mercy (1961) 
 Cain's Hundred, 2 episodes (1961-1962)
 Saints and Sinners, as Paul Graham in A Night of Horns and Bells (1962)
 Target: The Corruptors, as Carl Benham in episode Babes in Wall Street (1962)
 Stoney Burke, as Royce Hamilton in The Contender (1962)
 The Lloyd Bridges Show, as Dr. Olsen in episode My Child Is Yet a Stranger (1962)
 Checkmate, as Lawrence Dresher in episode Trial by Midnight (1962)
 Ben Casey, 2 episodes (1962-1963) 
 Dr. Kildare, as Dr. David Key in episode A Hand Held Out in Darkness (1963) 
 G.E. True, as Chuck Fowler in episode O.S.I. (1963)
 Empire, as Sid Keller in episode The Tiger Inside (1963)
 77 Sunset Strip, as Tom Carlyle in episode Never to Have Loved (1963)
 Bonanza, as James Callan in episode The Toy Soldier (1963) 
 Nightmare in Chicago, as Myron Ellis
 Mr. Broadway, as Geoffrey Karr in Sticks and Stones May Break My Bones (1964) 
 Slattery's People, as Harry Colby  in episode Question: What Is Honor?... What Is Death? (1964)
 The F.B.I., (1965–1974)
 Walt Disney's Wonderful World of Color, as Ed Barrett in 4-part episode Kilroy (1965) 
 Kentucky Jones, as Sam Clifton in episode The Music Kids Make (1965)
 Insight, 3 episodes (1967-1976)
 The Bionic Woman, as Dr. Kelso in episode Escape from Love (1977)
 The Incredible Hulk, as Dr. Murrow in episode The Quiet Room (1979)
 The Outer Limits, as Prof. Benedict O. Fields in Season One, Episode 18 ZZZZZ (1964)
 Perry Mason, as Edmond Aitken in Season Four, Episode 13, The Case of the Envious Editor (1961), as Harry Grant in Season 8, Episode 29 The Case of the Wrongful Writ (1965)
 Highway To Heaven, as Mr. Drake in Season Two, Episode 6, "Birds of a Feather" (1985)

References

External links

1924 births
1998 deaths
American male stage actors
American male film actors
American male television actors
American male voice actors
Actors from Lincoln, Nebraska
Male actors from Nebraska
Military personnel from Nebraska
Deaths from cancer in California
20th-century American male actors
Burials at San Fernando Mission Cemetery
Fordham University alumni